Fouad Elkaam (born 27 May 1988), also known as Fouad El Kaam, is a Moroccan middle-distance runner. He competed in the 1500 m event at the 2015 World Championships and 2016 Olympics. Elkaam tested positive for the stimulant methylhexaneamine in June 2011 and was subsequently handed a 6-month ban from sports.

References

External links

 
 
 
 
 

1988 births
Living people
Doping cases in athletics
Moroccan male middle-distance runners
Moroccan sportspeople in doping cases
World Athletics Championships athletes for Morocco
Place of birth missing (living people)
Athletes (track and field) at the 2016 Summer Olympics
Olympic athletes of Morocco
Mediterranean Games bronze medalists for Morocco
Mediterranean Games medalists in athletics
Athletes (track and field) at the 2018 Mediterranean Games
Islamic Solidarity Games competitors for Morocco
20th-century Moroccan people
21st-century Moroccan people